Arion subfuscus is a species of land slug. It forms a species complex with Arion fuscus.

References

subfuscus
Gastropods described in 1805